This is a list of numbered federal highways (carreteras federales) in Mexico.  Federal Highways from north to south are assigned odd numbers; highways from west to east are assigned even numbers. The numbering scheme starts in the northwest of the country (in Tijuana, Baja California).  The highest designation, Mexican Federal Highway 307, is assigned to roads hugging the coast of Quintana Roo and the international border in Chiapas. This list identifies the road starting point at the north or the west point of the highway and terminus at its eastern or southern point.

Motorways and roads with restricted access are considered part of the Federal Highways network and follow the same numbering schema.  The letter "D" (for Directo) is added to the road number for all toll roads. For information on toll roads, see List of Mexican autopistas.

List of highways

 

|-

State highways

Every state in Mexico builds and maintains their own state highways, which supplement the federal network. Some of these roads are unnumbered; those that have varying numbering schemes depending on the state. Shields for these roads contain the abbreviation of the state up top. State highways that are tolled, like their federal counterparts, bear a D in their designations, such as Sinaloa State Highway 1D.

See also
Pan-American Highway
Inter-American Highway

References
Secretariat of Communications and Transportation, Datos Viales 2017 
INEGI,

External links
Road numbering systems – Mexico

 
Federal